Deborah R. Cochran was an American politician who represented the 11th Norfolk District in the Massachusetts House of Representatives. She was also the Republican nominee in  Massachusetts's 9th congressional district in 1982 and Massachusetts Secretary of the Commonwealth in 1986.

Early life
Cochran was born on September 18, 1939, in New York City. She attended Wellesley College, New York University, and Smith College. Prior to entering politics, Cochran worked as a child abuse investigation coordinator.

Political career
Cochran began her political career in Dedham, Massachusetts, where she was a town meeting member and chairman of the Republican town committee.

From 1979 to 1983, Cochran represented the 11th Norfolk District in the Massachusetts House of Representatives. In 1982 she ran against Joe Moakley in Massachusetts's ninth congressional district. She lost 64% to 34%.

In 1986 she was recruited by leaders in the Massachusetts Republican Party to challenge Secretary of the Commonwealth Michael J. Connolly. She lost 68% to 32%.

In 1992, she served as David J. Lionett's campaign manager in his race for the seat in Massachusetts's 3rd congressional district. He lost in the Republican primary to Peter I. Blute.

Death
Cochran died on October 20, 2004.

References

1939 births
2004 deaths
New York University alumni
Republican Party members of the Massachusetts House of Representatives
Smith College alumni
Wellesley College alumni
20th-century American politicians
Women state legislators in Massachusetts
20th-century American women politicians
21st-century American women